Gentileschi is an Italian surname. Notable people with the surname include:

 Orazio Gentileschi (1563–1639), Italian painter
 Artemisia Gentileschi (1593–1653), Baroque painter, daughter of Orazio

Italian-language surnames